Control and Resistance is the second and final album by progressive metal band Watchtower, released in 1989. This was the band's last album before disbanding in 1993 while working on its never-released third album Mathematics, and their first release with vocalist Alan Tecchio and guitarist Ron Jarzombek. Control and Resistance combines elements of thrash metal, progressive metal and jazz fusion, and has been cited as one of the most influential albums in the technical thrash metal genre, as well as a major influence on the then-emerging technical death metal scene.

Reception

Control and Resistance was hailed by Guitar World magazine as one of "The Top Ten Shred Albums of the 80's" in a retrospective feature, "Sounding like the twisted scion of Metallica and the Mahavishnu Orchestra, Watchtower was the most brilliant weird band of its time. Guitarist Ron Jarzombek, with his complex harmony solos, strange scales and furious staccato lead bursts, performs tricks on his guitar that will leave you more than sufficiently breathless."

Track listing
 "Instruments of Random Murder" – 4:06
 "The Eldritch" – 3:17
 "Mayday in Kiev" – 5:48
 "The Fall of Reason" – 8:01
 "Control and Resistance" – 6:58
 "Hidden Instincts" – 3:51
 "Life Cycles" – 6:48
 "Dangerous Toy" – 4:20

tracks 1, 2, 4 & 5 written by Doug Keyser  
tracks 3, 6, 7 & 8 written by Doug Keyser and Ron Jarzombek

Notes
 The vinyl and compact disc versions of the album each feature distinctly different front cover artwork.
 "Instruments of Random Murder" and "The Eldritch" were previously demoed in early 1987 at Cedar Creek Studios in Austin, TX. It was the first ever recording with Ron Jarzombek on guitar.
 "The Fall of Reason" and "Hidden Instincts" were previously demoed by the band on a 4-track recorder in the fall of 1987.
 Both 1987 demos are contained on the 2002 archives release Demonstrations In Chaos.
 The original working title for "Hidden Instincts" was "Plastic Lasagna".
 "Dangerous Toy" was previously recorded with Mike Soliz on vocals for the 1989 Doomsday News 2 compilation.

Band line-up
 Alan Tecchio - vocals
 Ron Jarzombek - guitars
 Doug Keyser - bass
 Rick Colaluca - drums

References

1989 albums
Watchtower (band) albums
Noise Records albums